DeSanctis is a surname. Notable people with the surname include:

 Adriana DeSanctis (born 1988), Canadian figure skater
 Gerardine DeSanctis (1954–2005), American organizational theorist

See also
 De Sanctis (disambiguation)
 DeSantis
 DeSanctis–Cacchione syndrome